John Kennedy (born May 27, 1950) is a former football player who played for the Ottawa Rough Riders, BC Lions, Montreal Alouettes and Toronto Argonauts in the Canadian Football League. Previously, he played football at Carleton University and Wilfrid Laurier University.

References

1950 births
Living people
BC Lions players
Players of Canadian football from Ontario
Sportspeople from Oshawa